The 2021–22 Danish Women's 1st Division (Danish: Danmarksturneringens 1. division i kvindefodbold 2021–22) was the thirteenth season of the Danish nation-wide second-tier association football division since its establishment in 1992 as part of the Danmarksturneringen i kvindefodbold's nation-wide league structure. The two or multiple group format of the second division was abolished and a single division format was reintroduced for the first time since the 2012–13 season and with fewer clubs partaking. Governed by the Danish FA, the season was launched on 7 August 2021 with two fixtures in the preliminary round (Dalum/Næsby vs B.93 and Odense Q vs Næstved HG) and concluded with the last four matches on 20 November 2021. All eight teams in the league took part in the previous season with four teams, Odense Q, B.93, IF ASA and Sundby BK, proceeding to the Qualification League without gaining promotion to the first division. The clubs in the division entered the 2021–22 Danish Women's Cup in the cup tournament's first round proper. The fixtures for the 2021–22 season were announced by the Danish FA's tournament committee and featured a twenty weeks long winter break.

In July 2021, Næstved HG Kvindeelite was formed as a superstructure between Næstved IF Fodbold and the women's football department of Herlufsholm GF, assuming the league license of Herlufsholm GF. Prior to the start of the season, the co-operation between Dalum IF and Næsby BK, known as Dalum/Næsby Pigefodbold, was extended to incorporate the first senior women's teams and assumed the league license of Næsby BK. Odense Q, Sundby BK, B.93 and Varde IF finished in the league's top half following the conclusion of the preliminary round and progressed to the Qualification League featuring the two lowest placed teams from the preliminary round of the first division. The bottom half of the table progressed to the 1st Division play-off round, featuring two qualified teams from the preliminary round of the third division, which determined the promotion and/or relegation spots between the second and third tiers.

Summary
Due to economic difficulties and the lack of an elite organization, the women's football department of Herlufsholm GF approached Næstved IF Fodbold with the intention of creating a women's superstructure between the two clubs, which resulted in Næstved HG Kvindeelite being formed on 1 July 2021, playing based on the league license of Herlufsholm GF. The superstructure between the women's football departments of Dalum IF and Næsby BK, known as Dalum/Næsby Pigefodbold, originally included youth and reserve teams, but beginning this season, it was expanded to incorporate the first senior women's teams and assumed the league license of Næsby BK in the second division under the revised name of Dalum/Næsby Kvinde- og Pigefodbold. At the beginning of the season, B.93's first senior women's team, represented by B.93 Q ApS (a subsidiary of B.93 Kontrakt Fodbold ApS, who runs the men's first team), were the only club in the league to have a license from the Danish FA to sign professional contracts with its players. With the arrival of an investor and the creation of an anpartsselskab, Odense Q was able to sign their first-ever semi-professional player contracts, starting with five players in August 2021. With an average age of nineteen, the players of Vildbjerg SF were reportedly among the youngest squads in the league, while Sundby BK's squad had an average age of 23 years.

The 2021–22 season was inaugurated on Saturday 7 August with two fixtures in the preliminary first round; Dalum/Næsby and B.93 played at Næsby Stadium, while Odense Q and Næstved HG played at exhibition pitch at Marienlystcentret, marking the debut matches of the two new superstructure of Næstved HG and Dalum/Næsby. B.93's Viktoria Einsbor scored the first goal of the season in the 12th minute behind Dalum/Næsby's goalkeeper. Silje Cassandra Simonsen netted the second goal for B.93 in the 60th minute, securing a victory in the first match. The first round matches between Sundby BK vs Varde IF at Sundby Idrætspark and IF ASA vs Vildbjerg SF on the artificial turf at Frederiksbjerg Idrætsanlæg got postponed to 18 September. Sundby BK started playing their home matches at the exhibition pitch at Sundby Idrætspark starting from this season to comply with future league license criteria from the Danish FA, after previously having played their games at the amateur sports facilities of Kløvermarken next to their offices. The local derby between Sundby BK and B.93 on 20 August 2021 attracted an attendance of 350 spectators. In December 2021, Sundby BK announced that five investors would contribute to the professional and commercial department involving the first men's and women's teams.

The third round match between Næstved Herlufsholm Fodbold and Vildbjerg SF at Næstved Stadium was a repeat of last season's 1st Division championship final at Vildbjerg between Vildbjerg SF and the founding parent club Herlufsholm GF. While the 2020–21 division final was won by Herlufsholm GF with 6–1, in the present season's first encounter between the two teams Vildbjerg SF secured a 3–2 away win against NIF HG seven minutes before full time. Næstved HG's losing streak was extended to six games in a row, producing a bottom place in the table, and resulting in the management's sacking of head coach Jeppe Tengbjerg during the women's international match window. The first win of the season for Næstved HG was achieved in the seventh round, in the first match under the new head coach, and former sports director, Steen "Olsen" Hansen, by defeating Dalum/Næstby at their own home ground.  Israeli international forward Rachel Shtainshnaider scored two goals and made an assist in NIF HG's third goal netted by Nicoline Dam Schrøder. With Steen Hansen unavailable for the home game against Sundby BK on 7 November 2021, Dennis Deleuran – the U-19 men's head coach of Næstved BK – stepped in as interim coach, guiding the Næstved HG's squad to their only second win of the 2021 fall season.

Odense Q gained an early lead in the league standings by procuring five victories and five clean sheets in the first five games, with Swedish goalkeeper Isabelle Granlund recording eight clean sheets by the end of the fall season and captain Kamilla Ørskov Jensen shared top scorer title in the preliminary round together with Sissel Bøje of Sundby BK, both scoring nine goals. Ten league matches into the season, Odense Q secured their participation in the Qualification League for two promotion spot to the next season's top-flight league and was joined by Sundby BK, B.93 and Varde IF after the 13th, 12th and 14th round respectively including the two lowest placed teams from the preliminary round of the Danish Women's League, AGF Kvindefodbold and AaB Kvinde Elitefodbold. ASA Fodbold, Dalum/Næsby Vildbjerg SF and Næstved HG moved on to the 1st Division play-off round for two relegation spots, together with the two winners of the 2nd Division preliminary round, Østerbro IF and JAI Fodbold.

Teams

Eight teams competed in the league – four teams from the Qualification League and four teams from second division play-offs of the previous season. The four teams from the Qualification League were Odense Q, B.93, IF ASA, and Sundby BK, who extended their spells in the second-tier of one, two, five, and nine years respectively, with B.93 having participated in the qualifications four seasons in a row. During the summer break, two new superstructures were formed, with Næstved HG assuming the league license of Herlufsholm GF, while Dalum/Næsby took Næsby BK's place in the second division.

Stadiums and locations

Personnel

Coaching changes

Preliminary round

League table
Every team played two games against the other teams, at home and away, totaling 14 games each. Teams received three points for a win and one point for a draw. If two or more teams were tied on points, places were then determined by goal difference. The four teams with the most points at the end of the preliminary round, qualify to play in the Qualification League against the two lowest placed teams of the first division, while the remaining four teams, joined by the two highest-placed teams of the preliminary round of the third division, continued to the 1st Division play-off round.

Results

1st Division play-off round

League table
The four lowest placed teams in the preliminary round were joined by the two highest-placed teams, eligible for promotion, of the preliminary round of the third division to partake in the 1st Division play-off round that determined promotion and/or relegations between the second and third tiers. Every team in the 1st Division play-off round play two games against the other teams, at home and away, totaling 10 each. Teams received three points for a win and one point for a draw. If two or more teams were tied on points, places were then determined by goal difference. The goal score and points from the preliminary rounds were reset. The two teams with the fewest points would be relegated to the 2022–23 Danish Women's 2nd Division.

Results

Statistics

Scoring

Top scorers

Hat-tricks

Clean sheets

References

2021–22 in Danish football